Marginella lateritia is a species of sea snail, a marine gastropod mollusk in the family Marginellidae, the margin snails.

Description

Distribution
This marine species occurs off the Andaman Islands

References

 Cossignani T. (2006). Marginellidae & Cystiscidae of the World. L'Informatore Piceno. 408pp
 Boyer F. (2018). Révision des gastéropodes marginelliformes dans le récifal supérieur des Maldives. Xenophora Taxonomy. 21: 22-47 page(s): 24, figs 2–9

External links
 J.C. & Sykes E.R. (1903). Description of Marginella lateritia, n. sp., from the Andaman islands. Proceedings of the Malacological Society of London. 5: 410.

Marginellidae
Gastropods described in 1903